Ante Milanovic-Litre (born October 17, 1994) is a professional Canadian football running back and fullback for the Ottawa Redblacks of the Canadian Football League (CFL).

University career
Milanovic-Litre played college football for the Simon Fraser Clan.

Professional career

Calgary Stampeders
Milanovic-Litre was drafted in fourth round, 28th overall, in the 2017 CFL Draft by the Calgary Stampeders and was signed on May 18, 2017. He won his first Grey Cup as a member of the Stampeders 106th Grey Cup championship team in 2018.

Edmonton Elks
Milanovic-Litre joined the Edmonton Elks in free agency on February 14, 2022. He played in all 18 regular season games where he had 54 carries for 241 yards and one touchdown along with 16 receptions for 89 yards. He became a free agent upon the expiry of his contract on February 14, 2023.

Ottawa Redblacks
On February 15, 2023, it was announced that Milanovic-Litre had signed a one-year contract with the Ottawa Redblacks.

References

External links
 Ottawa Redblacks bio

1994 births
Living people
Canadian football running backs
Canadian football fullbacks
Simon Fraser Clan football players
Calgary Stampeders players
Edmonton Elks players
Ottawa Redblacks players
Players of Canadian football from British Columbia
Canadian football people from Vancouver